The canton of Lot et Montbazinois is an administrative division of the Aveyron department, southern France. It was created at the French canton reorganisation which came into effect in March 2015. Its seat is in Capdenac-Gare.

It consists of the following communes:
 
Les Albres
Asprières
Balaguier-d'Olt
Bouillac
Capdenac-Gare
Causse-et-Diège
Foissac
Galgan
Lugan
Montbazens
Naussac
Peyrusse-le-Roc
Roussennac
Salles-Courbatiès
Sonnac
Valzergues

References

Cantons of Aveyron